Calochortus bruneaunis is a species of flowering plant in the lily family, and is known by the common name Bruneau mariposa lily.

Distribution
The plant is native to the Great Basin and adjacent regions in the Western United States, from eastern California and Oregon to Montana and Utah. It generally grows in dry, Sagebrush steppe habitats.

Description
Calochortus bruneaunis is a perennial herb producing a mostly unbranching stem up to 40 centimeters tall. The leaf at the base of the stem is narrow in shape, reaching 10 to 20 centimeters long and withering away at flowering.

The inflorescence bears 1 to 4 erect bell-shaped flowers. The pointed sepals and larger, rounded petals are white to lilac-tinted in base color. The sepals are marked with a reddish or greenish spot or streak toward their bases and the petals have a greenish streak on the outer surface and a base of yellow, purple, and red coloration on the inner surface.

The fruit is a narrow, angled capsule up to 7 centimeters long. It contains several flat, yellow seeds.

References

External links
Jepson Manual Treatment of Calochortus bruneaunis
USDA Plants Profile for Calochortus bruneaunis
Flora of North America
UC Photos gallery — Calochortus bruneaunis

bruneaunis
Flora of California
Flora of Idaho
Flora of Montana
Flora of Nevada
Flora of Oregon
Flora of Utah
Flora of Wyoming
Flora of the Great Basin
Flora of the Sierra Nevada (United States)